Presently curated and organized by Emeka Okafor, Henry Barnor and Jennifer Wolfe, Maker Faire Africa is an international organization co-founded by Mark Grimes (Felonious Nun) Emeka Okafor (TED Africa), Lars Hasselblad Torres (IDEAS Global Challenge), Erik Hersman (Afrigadget) and Nii Simmonds (Nubian Cheetah). Maker Faire Africa aims to engage with on-the-ground breakthrough organizations and individual makers to sharpen focus on locally generated, bottom-up prototypes of technologies that solve immediate challenges to development.

Overview
The aim of a Maker Faire Africa is to create a space on the African continent where Afrigadget-type innovations, inventions and initiatives can be sought, identified, brought to life, supported, amplified and propagated. At the same time, Maker Faire Africa would seek to imbue creative types in science and technology with an appreciation of fabrication and by default manufacturing.
The first Maker Faire Africa was in Ghana in 2009. The second phase was held in Nairobi, Kenya in 2010, the third in Cairo in 2011, the fourth in Lagos, the fifth abroad (Istanbul, Milan, New York City) and the sixth in Johannesburg.

References

Images

Further reading
 Ariel Schwartz. "Creative Gadgets Dominate Maker Faire Africa." Fast Company, Aug 27, 2010

External links

Maker Faire Africa
Makerfaireafrica Blog
Afrigadget
Ned.com
 Flickr. Maker Faire Africa 2010
 Flickr. Maker Faire Africa 2010 -Nairobi
 Flickr. Cairo, Maker Faire Africa Day 3, Oct-2011

See also
 Creative problem solving
 Theories of technology
 Ecoinnovation
 Information revolution
 Invention
 Knowledge economy
 Open Innovation

International organizations based in Africa
Recurring events established in 2009
Appropriate technology organizations
Scientific organizations based in Africa
International economic organizations